Richard Callahan may refer to:

 Richard R. Callahan (1947–1967), awarded the Coast Guard Medal
 Richard G. Callahan (born 1947), American attorney

See also
 Richard Callaghan, American figure skating coach